And Tomorrow the Entire World is a 2020 German-French political drama film directed by Julia von Heinz. It premiered in competition at the 77th Venice International Film Festival. It was selected as the German entry for the Best International Feature Film at the 93rd Academy Awards, but it was not nominated. The title of the film is taken from the line "Today Germany belongs to us, and tomorrow the whole world" from the National Socialist propaganda song "The Rotten Bones Tremble".

Plot
Luisa, a 20-year-old law student from an upper-class family, moves in to a collective housing squat and becomes an anti-fascist activist because she is opposed to the rise of the neo-Nazi  political right in Germany.

The plot is partly inspired by the biography of director Julia von Heinz, who engaged in anti-fascism herself when she was younger. The political design of the movie's right-wing "Liste 14" party is also a reference to that of the group Alternative for Germany.

Cast
 Mala Emde as Luisa
  as Alfa
 Tonio Schneider as Lenor
  as Batte
  as Dietmar

Production
The film was produced by the motion picture companies Seven Elephants, Kings & Queens Filmproduktion, and Haïku Films on behalf of the public broadcasting channels Südwestrundfunk, Westdeutscher Rundfunk, Bayerischer Rundfunk, and Arte. It received financial support by the FilmFernsehFonds Bayern, the Medienboard Berlin-Brandenburg, the Centre national du cinéma et de l'image animée, the Minitraité, the Medien- und Filmgesellschaft Baden-Württemberg, the Deutscher Filmförderfonds, and the Filmförderungsanstalt. The support of the Filmförderungsanstalt accounted for 310,000 Euro.

See also
 List of submissions to the 93rd Academy Awards for Best International Feature Film
 List of German submissions for the Academy Award for Best International Feature Film

References

External links
 

2020 films
2020 drama films
2020s German-language films
French political drama films
German political drama films
Films about terrorism in Europe
Films about neo-Nazism
2020s French films